Paul Craig Hunt (born 8 October 1970) is an English former professional footballer who played in the Football League for Swindon Town as a striker.

Career
Hunt came through the youth set up at Swindon Town making his first team debut on 16 September 1989 in a home game at the County Ground against Barnsley. Hunt played alongside the likes of Glenn Hoddle, Paul Bodin and Colin Calderwood in his time with Swindon. He eventually left Swindon in May 1993 and signed for Gloucester City.

Brief spells with Cardiff City in the 1993–94 season, Bristol Rovers, Norwegian side SK Brann, Andover and Cirencester Town followed before a long term move to Forest Green Rovers in 1996 where he linked up with manager Frank Gregan who had been his boss at Andover.

Hunt earned back to back promotions with Forest Green through the Southern League in to the Conference National for the 1998–1999 season. He was then a part of the Forest Green side that reached the 1999 FA Trophy final, eventually losing 1–0 against Kingstonian at Wembley Stadium. At the end of the 1999–2000 season he famously came off the bench in a home game against Kettering Town and scored and inspired Forest Green to Conference National safety with just minutes left in the final game of the season. He was again involved in a run which saw Forest Green reach the 2001 FA Trophy Final. However Forest Green again suffered defeat, this time to Canvey Island at Villa Park.

He eventually left Forest Green and followed Frank Gregan to Aberystwyth Town. When Gregan left Aberystwyth Hunt also exited in December 2001. He returned to English football with a short spell at Bath City. He left Bath for a return to Wales with Merthyr Tydfil later that month.

Hunt left Merthyr Tydfil for Clevedon Town. He then signed for Swindon Supermarine in October 2002. He then joined Hungerford Town on a deal until the end of the 2002–2003 season.

Hunt went on to represent several non-league sides around the south west including a couple of spells at Weston-super-Mare. In December 2004, he joined Mangotsfield United.

In May 2007, he was appointed assistant manager to Adi Viveash at Cirencester Town. He would then go on to work as assistant manager at Thatcham Town.

References

External links

Hunt player profile at Swindon Town
Hunt player history at Gloucester City
Hunt player profile at Non League Daily

1970 births
Sportspeople from Swindon
Living people
English footballers
Swindon Town F.C. players
Gloucester City A.F.C. players
Cardiff City F.C. players
Bristol Rovers F.C. players
SK Brann players
Andover F.C. players
Cirencester Town F.C. players
Forest Green Rovers F.C. players
Aberystwyth Town F.C. players
Bath City F.C. players
Merthyr Tydfil F.C. players
Taunton Town F.C. players
Clevedon Town F.C. players
Swindon Supermarine F.C. players
Hungerford Town F.C. players
Highworth Town F.C. players
Weston-super-Mare A.F.C. players
Mangotsfield United F.C. players
Fairford Town F.C. players
Association football forwards